York East was a federal electoral district represented in the House of Commons of Canada at different times. It was located in the province of Ontario.

History
The first federal riding of York East was created by the British North America Act of 1867. Called the East Riding of York, it consisted of the Townships of Markham, Scarborough, the Village of Yorkville and the portion of the Township of York lying east of Yonge Street.  In 1882, it was redefined to consist of the townships of East York, Scarborough and Markham, and the villages of Yorkville and Markham.

The electoral district was abolished in 1903 when it was redistributed between Toronto North, York Centre and York South ridings.

In 1914, the East Riding of York was recreated out of York Centre and York South ridings, and was defined as consisting of the township of Scarboro, and the eastern portion of the city of Toronto south of Danforth Avenue and east of Pape Avenue. The electoral district was abolished in 1924 when it was redistributed between Toronto—Scarborough and York South ridings.

In 1933, the riding of York East was created from parts of York North and York South ridings, and was defined as consisting of the part of the county of York lying south of the township of Whitchurch, east of Yonge Street, and north of the city of Toronto, and including the village of Stouffville.

In 1947, it was redefined to consist of the part of the county of York lying south of the township of Markham, east of Yonge Street and north of the city of Toronto. In 1952, it was redefined to consist of the township of East York and the part of North York township bounded south of Lawrence Avenue and east of the town of Leaside and Leslie Street.

In 1966 and 1976, it was redefined with reference to various streets and rivers in Metropolitan Toronto. The electoral district was abolished in 1987 when it was redistributed between Beaches—Woodbine, Broadview—Greenwood, Don Valley West and Don Valley East ridings.

Members of Parliament

This riding has elected the following Members of Parliament:

Election results

East Riding of York, 1867–1904

{| class="wikitable"
|- style="background-color:#E9E9E9"
! colspan="6"|1867 Canadian federal election
|- style="background-color:#E9E9E9"
! colspan="2" style="width: 200px"|Party
! style="width: 170px"|Candidate
! style="width: 40px"|Votes
|-

| style="width: 185px"| Liberal
|James Metcalfe
|align="right"| 1,174

| style="width: 185px"| Unknown
| T. A. Milne
|align="right"| 937

York East, 1917–1925

York East, 1935–1988

See also 
 List of Canadian federal electoral districts
 Past Canadian electoral districts

References

Election results from Parliament of Canada website

Former federal electoral districts of Ontario
Federal electoral districts of Toronto